Norberto Borja Gonzales (born April 17, 1947) is a Filipino social democratic politician who served as secretary of national defense and national security adviser under 14th President Gloria Macapagal Arroyo. Gonzales was a candidate in the 2022 presidential election.

Career

Foundation of the PDSP 
Gonzales completed a pre-medicine course in Ateneo de Davao. During the second term of President Ferdinand Marcos, Gonzales joined the burgeoning anti-government protests. The protest movement he co-organized became the Kilusan ng mga Demokra­tikong Sosyalista ng Pilipinas, which later became the Partido Demokra­tiko Sosyalista ng Pilipinas (PDSP). The PDSP worked together with the Moro National Liberation Front (MNLF) to help overthrow Marcos. Once Marcos was ousted, his successor Corazon Aquino appointed him as a negotiator to the MNLF. Two years later, a peace agreement was signed between the government and the MNLF. A decade later. Gonzales was appointed presidential adviser for special concerns and presidential chief of staff by President Gloria Macapagal Arroyo.

Arroyo administration 
Gonzales was appointed as national security adviser in February 2005 until his appointment as the defense chief in July 2007. He briefly served for a month and was replaced by Gilbert Teodoro.  As national security adviser, he was ordered detained by the Senate for contempt of Congress in 2005. Later on, he cited the ongoing communist insurgency as a reason why the Philippines remained a "Third World country." He proposed crafting a good strategy to defeat the rebels, or extending President Gloria Macapagal Arroyo's term.

After Teodoro's announcement of his presidential candidacy, Gonzales served as the secretary of national defense again from November 2009 until June 30, 2010.

Post-Arroyo administration 
Upon Teodoro losing in the 2010 election, he and Gonzales were originally seen to form the new opposition bloc to counter president-elect Benigno Aquino III. In 2015, Senator Antonio Trillanes said that Gonzales was planning a coup to oust Aquino. Gonzales replied that while "coups don't succeed in the Philippines," president Aquino should "step down."

During the presidency of Rodrigo Duterte, Gonzales said that "a Chinese invasion is not unthinkable."

2022 presidential campaign
Gonzales is the chairman and official nominee for president in the 2022 election of the Philippine Democratic Socialist Party. He announced and filed his candidacy on October 6, 2021. A lifelong social democrat, he insists on a "new and more politically mature approach to winning the nation's heart and its consent to govern." He also wants the Department of Agriculture to be reformed and asserted  that "food production" will be his priority if elected. He mentioned President Rodrigo Duterte’s "weak COVID-19 response" as one of the main reasons why he ran for president. He ended up being 9th Place in the 2022 presidential election having about 89,097 votes.

References

1947 births
Filipino social democrats
Filipino exiles
National Security Advisers of the Philippines
Politicians from Bataan
Secretaries of National Defense of the Philippines
Candidates in the 2022 Philippine presidential election
Presidential chiefs of staff (Philippines)
Living people